Peace, Love and Murder is the third album by American rock band My Dad Is Dead, released on vinyl in May 1987 by Birth Records, later reissued on CD and vinyl by Houses In Motion.

Reception 

Trouser Press called it "a compelling, hypnotic debut".

Track listing 
 All songs written by Mark Edwards except when stated. 
 "Force Feed" - 3:54 
 "Babe in the Woods" - 3:05 
 "Open Wide" - 3:48 
 "the Dark Side" - 3:35 
 "Like a Vise" - 5:22 
 "Breakdown" - 4:34 
 "Hill O' Beans" - 4:29 
 "Your Love" - 3:49 
 "20 Yards Deep" - 3:19 
 "Fireball" - 4:37 
 
Notes 
Recorded Summer/Fall 1986.  Comes with lyric sheet.

Credits 
 Directed by, Songwriter, six-string Guitar, Vocals, Bass Guitar, Drum Machine programs sequenced by – Mark Edwards  
 Back Cover Photography by – Tim Gilbride   
 Producer– Chris Burgess

References

External links 
 MY DAD IS DEAD - A NEW CLEAR ROUTE hosts the press release for the album.
 

1987 albums
My Dad Is Dead albums